Joy v. North, 692 F.2d 880 (2d Cir. 1982) is a US corporate law case, concerning the rules for bringing a corporate derivative suit. The case arose under Connecticut law, but the opinion extensively discussed by analogy the relevant standards under Delaware and New York law.

Facts
Doris Joy was a minority shareholder in Citytrust, Inc and Nelson North was the CEO. Doris complained that Nelson had given a loan to Katz Corp, without considering the merits of the deal, because Katz Corp employed Nelson's son. Citytrust, Inc established a 'Special Litigation Committee' of two independent directors, which concluded that the litigation should be discontinued in respect of most of the board members.

Judgment
Judge Winter held that the litigation was warranted. If the case appears to be worth a substantial amount in relation to equity, the case should continue. If not it must consider further business factors.

Judge Cardamone, dissenting, disapproved of the method. He said future attorney fees and litigation expenses, corporate goodwill and corporate morale cannot be determined.

See also

United States corporate law

Notes

References

United States corporate case law
Delaware state case law